Rufus is a masculine given name, a surname, an Ancient Roman cognomen and a nickname (from Latin rufus, "red"). Notable people with the name include:

Given name

Politicians
 Rufus Ada George (born 1940), Nigerian politician
 Rufus Aladesanmi III (born 1945), Yoruban king
 Rufus Applegarth (1844–1921), American lawyer and politician
 Rufus A. Ayers (1849–1926), American lawyer, businessman, and politician
 Rufus Barringer (1821–1895), American lawyer, politician, and military general
 Rufus Blodgett (1834–1910), American politician and railroad superintendent
 Rufus Bousquet (born 1958), Saint Lucian politician
 Rufus E. Brown (1854–1920), Vermont attorney, farmer, and politician
 Rufus Bullock (1834–1907), American politician
 Rufus Carter (1866–1932), Canadian farmer and political figure
 Rufus Cheney Jr., member of the Wisconsin State Assembly during the 1850 session
 Rufus W. Cobb (1829–1913), American politician
 Rufus Curry (1859–1934), Canadian manufacturer and politician
 Rufus Davis (born 1964), mayor of Camilla, Georgia
 Rufus B. Dodge Jr. (1861–1935), American lawyer and politician
 Rufus A. Doughton (1857–1946), American politician
 Rufus Easton (1774–1834), American lawyer and politician
 Rufus L. Edmisten (born 1941), American politician and lawyer
 Rufus Elefante (1903–1994), American politician from Utica, New York
 Rufus Nelson England (1851–1911), Canadian merchant and political figure
 Rufus S. Frost (1826–1894), American politician
 Rufus King Garland Jr. (1830–1886), American politician
 Rufus K. Goodenow (1790–1863), American politician
 Rufus Hardy (representative) (1855–1943), American politician
 Rufus Erastus Hart (1812–1891), American politician and lawyer
 Rufus Henderson (1779–1847), Canadian physician, merchant and political figure
 Rufus Isaacs, 1st Marquess of Reading (1860–1935), English politician and jurist
 Rufus King (1755–1827), pre-Civil War US politician
 Rufus H. King (1820–1890), American politician
 Rufus E. Lester (1837–1906), American politician
 Rufus Anderson Lyman (1842–1910), lawyer and politician in the Kingdom of Hawaii
 Rufus Mallory (1831–1914), American educator, lawyer, and politician
 Rufus P. Manson (1830–1897), American politician
 Rufus McIntire (1784–1866), American lawyer, military officer, congressman, and land surveyor
 Rufus Wheeler Peckham (1809–1873), American judge and congressman
 Rufus W. Peckham (1838–1909), American jurist
 Rufus Ferrand Pelletier (1824–?), American postmaster and politician
 Rufus Phillips (born 1929), American intelligence officer
 Rufus Henry Pope (1857–1944), Canadian politician
 Rufus King Polk (1866–1902), American politician
 Rufus Pollock (born 1980), English economist
 Rufus P. Ranney (1813–1891), American politician
 Rufus Rodriguez (born 1953), Filipino politician
 Rufus Smith (1766–1844), Canadian physician and politician
 Rufus P. Spalding (1798–1886), American politician, lawyer and judge

Religious figures
 Rufus (biblical figure), a first-century Christian mentioned in Mark 15:21
 Rufus Anderson (1796–1880), American minister
 Rufus Babcock (1798–1895), American clergyman and academic
 Rufus Brome (born 1935), Bishop of Barbados
 Rufus Hollis Gause (1925–2015), American theologian
 Rufus Halley (c. 1944–2001), Roman Catholic missionary in the Philippines
 Rufus K. Hardy (1878–1945), leader and missionary in The Church of Jesus Christ of Latter-day Saints
 Rufus Phineas Stebbins (1810–1885), American clergyman

Sportsmen
 Rufus Alexander (born 1983), American football player
 Rufus Bess (born 1956), American football player
 Rufus Brevett (born 1969), English football player
 Rufus Brown (born 1980), American football player
 Rufus Crawford (born 1955), Canadian Football League player
 Rufus Deal (1917–2005), American football player
 Rufus French (born 1978), American football player
 Rufus Gilbert (1885–1962), American football, basketball, and baseball player and coach
 Rufus Granderson (1936–2015), American football player
 Rufus Guthrie (1942–2000), American football player
 Rufus Mayes (1947–1990), American football player
 Rufus Meadows (1907–1970), American baseball player
 Rufus B. Nalley (1870–1902), football, baseball, and track and field player
 Rufus Porter (American football) (born 1965), American football player
 Rufus Sisson (1890–1977), American basketball player
 Rufus Skillern (born 1982), Canadian football player
 Rufus Smith (baseball) (1905–1984), American baseball player

Performers
 Rufus Beck (born 1957), German theater, film, and voice actor
 Rufus Cappadocia, Canadian-American cellist
 Rufus Carl Gordon, Jr. (1932-2010), commonly known as Carl Gordon, American actor
 Rufus Harley (1936–2006), American jazz musician
 Rufus Hound (born 1979), British comedian
 Rufus Arthur Johnson (born 1976), better known as Bizarre, American rapper
 Rufus Jones (actor) (born 1975), English actor, comedian and writer
 Rufus "Speedy" Jones (1936–1990), American jazz drummer
 Rufus Payne (1883–1939), American blues musician known as Tee Tot
 Rufus Reid (born 1944), American jazz bassist, educator, and composer
 Rufus Sewell (born 1967), British actor
 Rufus C. Somerby (1832–1903), American entertainer, showman, and panoramist
 Rufus Tiger Taylor (born 1991), English musician
 Rufus Thibodeaux (1934–2005), American Cajun fiddler
 Rufus Thomas (1917–2001), American singer
 Rufus P. Turner (1907–1982), American electronics author
 Rufus Wainwright (born 1973), Canadian-American singer-songwriter
 Rufus Waller, better known as Scola, a member of Dru Hill, American singer and musician

Others

 Rufus Travis Amis (1912–2007), American entrepreneur
 Rufus William Bailey (1793–1863), American academic
 Rufus Black (born 1969), Vice-Chancellor of the University of Tasmania
 Rufus Bowen (1947–1978), American professor of mathematics
 Rufus S. Bratton (1892–1958), American intelligence officer
 Rufus Columbus Burleson (1823–1901), American academic
 Rufus T. Bush (1840–1890), American businessman, oil refining industrialist, and yachtsman
 Rufus Choate (1799–1859), American lawyer and orator
 Rufus Early Clement (1900–1967), American academic
 Rufus Cole (1872–1966), American medical doctor
 Rufus Cowles Crampton (1828–1888), American educator
 Rufus Dawes (1838–1899), American military officer
 Rufus C. Dawes (1867–1940), American businessman
 Rufus Dayglo, English comics artist
 Rufus of Ephesus, 1st-century Greco-Roman physician and anatomist
 Rufus Estes (b. 1857 - d.1939), an American chef aboard luxury railway Pullman Company
 J. Rufus Fears (1945–2012), American historian, scholar, teacher and author
 Rufus Fitzgerald (1890–1966), American academic at the University of Pittsburgh
 Rufus Flint (c. 1865 – c. 1895), American Nicaraguan professor of English and mathematics
 Rufus Edward Foster (1871–1942), American jurist
 Rufus Franklin (1916–1975), American criminal
 Rufus Henry Gilbert (1832–1885), American surgeon and inventor
 Rufus Wilmot Griswold (1815–1857), American anthologist, editor, poet, and critic
 Rufus Hannah (1954–2017), aka "Rufus the Stunt Bum", of Bumfights fame
 Rufus Carrollton Harris (1897–1988), American academic
 Rufus D. Hayes (1913–2002), American attorney, judge, and businessman
 Rufus G. Herring (1921–1996), American military officer and Medal of Honor winner
 Rufus Hessberg, American doctor and aeromedical scientist
 Rufus C. Holman (1877–1959), American politician and businessman
 Rufus K. Howell (1820–1890), Justice of the Louisiana Supreme Court
 Rufus Hussey (1919–1994), American slingshot marksman
 Rufus Ingalls (1818–1893), American military general
 Rufus Henry Ingram (1834–?), American bushwhacker
 Rufus Isaacs (game theorist) (1914–1981), American mathematician
 Rufus Zenas Johnston (1874–1959), American military officer and Medal of Honor winner
 Rufus Jones (writer) (1863–1948), American writer, philosopher and Quaker
 Rufus R. Jones (1933–1993), American wrestler
 Rufus Keppel, 10th Earl of Albemarle (born 1965), product designer and founder of a men's-shirt company
 Rufus King (general) (1814–1876), American newspaper editor, educator, diplomat, and military general
 Rufus King (writer) (1893–1966), American author of crime novels
 Rufus King Jr. (1838–1900), American military officer
 Rufus B. von KleinSmid (1875–1964), American academic
 Rufus Osgood Mason (1830–1903), American physician, teacher, and researcher in parapsychology and hypnotherapy
 Rufus May (born 1968?), British clinical psychologist
 Rufus McCain (1903–1940), American prisoner at Alcatraz
 Rufus Naylor (1882–1939), Australian sporting entrepreneur and gambler
 Rufus Norris (born 1965), British theatre director
 Rufus Palmer (1828–1873), Canadian physician and political figure
 Rufus Porter (painter) (1792–1884), American painter, inventor, and founder of Scientific American magazine
 Rufus Putnam (1738–1824), American military officer
 Rufus N. Rhodes (1856–1910), American newspaper editor
 Rufus G. Russell (1823–1896), American architect
 Rufus Sage (1817–1893), American writer, journalist and mountain man
 Rufus Saxton (1824–1908), American military general
 Rufus Stephenson (1835–1901), Canadian newspaper editor and political figure
 Rufus Stokes (1922–1986), American inventor

 Rufus B. Tebbetts (1828–?), American settler
 Rufus of Thebes, bishop of Thebes in Greece, referenced in Romans 16:13
 Rufus Welch (1800–1856), American circus impresario
 Rufus Corbin Wood (1818–1885), sheriff of Norfolk County, Massachusetts
 Rufus Yerxa (born 1951), American Deputy Director-General of the World Trade Organization
 Rufus Fairchild Zogbaum (1849–1925), American illustrator, journalist and author

Surname 

 Alexis Rufus (born 1979), English Muay Thai kickboxer
 Anneli Rufus, American journalist
 Geoffrey Rufus (died 1141), English Bishop and Lord Chancellor
 Milan Rúfus (1928–2009), Slovak poet and writer
 Richard Rufus (born 1975), English football player

Cognomen or nickname 

 Rufus (born 1942), stage name of Italian-French actor Jacques Narcy
 Rufus (Roman cognomen), list of people who had one of the most common of the ancient Roman cognomina
 King William II of England (1050s–1100), called "William Rufus"
 Alan Rufus (c. 1040–1089), companion of William the Conqueror
 Richard Rufus of Cornwall (died 1260), English scholastic philosopher and theologian
 Roger Squires, crossword compiler nicknamed Rufus

Animals 

 Rufus the Hawk, a bird used to keep pigeons away from the tennis grass courts at Wimbledon

Fictional characters 

 Rufus (Street Fighter), one of four new fighters in Street Fighter IV
 Rufus the Bobcat, the mascot for Ohio University
 Rufus, a naked mole rat from Disney's TV show Kim Possible; see List of Kim Possible characters
Rufus Carlin, a main character in the 2016 NBC show Timeless
 Rufus Moffat, title character of the book Rufus M. by Eleanor Estes
 Rufus Ruffcut, from Hanna-Barbera's TV show Wacky Races
 Rufus Scrimgeour, from the Harry Potter universe; see Ministry of Magic
 Rufus Shinra, from the Final Fantasy VII video games; see Characters of the Final Fantasy VII series
 Rufus Turner, from the American television drama Supernatural; see List of Supernatural characters
 Rufus XIV, King of Rubovia, in the 1955 British children's television series A Rubovian Legend
 Rufus, from the film The Rescuers
 Rufus, the forgotten 13th apostle in the film Dogma, played by Chris Rock
 Rufus, polar bear character from the animated series SantApprentice; see List of Santa's Apprentice characters
 Rufus, protagonist of the children's cartoon series The Dreamstone
 Rufus, time traveler in the films Bill & Ted's Excellent Adventure and Bill & Ted's Bogus Journey, played by George Carlin
Rufus, time traveler in the television Bill & Ted's Excellent Adventures (1992 TV series), an adaptation of the above film, played by Rick Overton 
 Rufus Humphrey, a character in Gossip Girl
 Rufus, a character in the movie Kill Bill: Volume 2, played by Samuel L. Jackson
 Rufus T. Firefly, a character in the 1933 film Duck Soup, played by Groucho Marx

See also 
 Saint Rufus (disambiguation)
 

English masculine given names

es:Rufo
fr:Rufus (homonymie)
id:Rufus
it:Rufus
nl:Rufus
pt:Rufus
vi:Rufus